Sonny Cox (born 11 October 2004) is an English professional footballer who plays as a forward for  club Bath City on loan from Exeter City.

Early and personal life
Cox attended Exmouth Community College.

Playing career
Cox signed his first professional contract with Exeter City in July 2021, at the age of sixteen, having been with the club since the age of seven. He had spent a week on trial at Manchester United earlier in the year. He made his first-team debut on 5 October, he came on as a 49th-minute substitute for Archie Collins in a 2–2 draw at Cheltenham Town in the EFL Trophy.

On 21 January 2022, Cox joined Southern League Premier Division South side Weston-super-Mare on loan for the remainder of the 2021–22 season.

The beginning of the 2022-23 season saw Cox feature in the first-team squad more prominently, including appearing off the bench in 5 league games. Cox netted a debut first-team goal for Exeter in the closing stages of a 2-4 defeat at home to Oxford United on the 15 October 2022.

On 26 December 2022, it was confirmed that Cox had joined National League South side Bath City on an initial one-month loan. The loan deal was extended until the end of the season on 28 January 2023.

Career statistics

References

2004 births
Living people
English footballers
Association football forwards
Exeter City F.C. players
Weston-super-Mare A.F.C. players
Bath City F.C. players
English Football League players
Southern Football League players
National League (English football) players